Nenad Perović (born 2 June 1993) is a Serbian football forward, who plays for FK Dunav Stari Banovci.

References

External links
 
 

1993 births
Living people
Footballers from Belgrade
Association football forwards
Serbian footballers
FK Palić players
FK Jedinstvo Užice players
FK Sloga Kraljevo players
FK BSK Borča players
FK TSC Bačka Topola players
FK Novi Pazar players
Serbian First League players
Serbian SuperLiga players
Serbian expatriate footballers
Serbian expatriate sportspeople in Slovenia
Expatriate footballers in Slovenia
NK Triglav Kranj players